David Lee is a retired English professional darts player who competed in British Darts Organisation events in the 1970s, 1980s and 1990s.

Career

Lee made his World Professional Darts Championship debut in 1983, defeating Canada's Tony Holyoake in the first round before losing in the second round to Eric Bristow.  After a first round exit in 1985, Lee made it to the second round in 1986 and 1987.  Lee made a total of four appearances in the World Championship but never made it to the quarter finals.  Lee also played in the Winmau World Masters five times with his best run coming in 1983, reaching the semi finals with notable wins over then World Champion Keith Deller and Bob Anderson, eventually losing to Mike Gregory.  He also reached the quarter finals in the 1984 World Masters, losing to Deller who managed to avenge his defeat to Lee 12 months before.

Lee won two unranked tournaments in his career, the 1984 Double Diamond Masters, beating Bob Anderson in the final and the prestigious News of the World Darts Championship in 1985.  He was a quarter finalist in numerous events such as the MFI World Matchplay in 1984 and 1985, the Butlins Grand Masters in 1985, the British Matchplay in 1986 and the Dry Blackthorn Cider Masters in 1987.  He also reached the semi finals of the 1988 British Open.

Following a first round exit in the 1989 Winmau World Masters to Steve Gittins, Lee failed to qualify for any of the major tournaments and faded from the darts scene completely following the split in darts.

Lee quit the BDO in 1996.

Personal life

His wife, Sandra Lee, also played darts professionally, for Wales.

World Championship results

BDO

 1983: 2nd Round (lost to Eric Bristow 2-3)
 1985: 1st Round (lost to Luc Marreel 1–2)
 1986: 2nd Round (lost to Terry O'Dea 0–3)
 1987: 2nd Round (lost to John Lowe 1-3)

External links
Dave Lee's stats and profile on Darts Database

English darts players
Living people
Year of birth missing (living people)
British Darts Organisation players